Mattia Pin (born February 17, 1988, in Rome) is an Italian professional football player currently playing for Lega Pro Seconda Divisione team Crociati Noceto on loan from Parma F.C.

External links
 

1988 births
Living people
Italian footballers
U.S. Sassuolo Calcio players
Parma Calcio 1913 players
Association football forwards
P.D. Castellarano players